A commemorative plaque, or simply plaque, or in other places referred to as a historical marker, historic marker, or historic plaque, is a plate of metal, ceramic, stone, wood, or other material, typically attached to a wall, stone, or other vertical surface, and bearing text or an image in relief, or both, to commemorate one or more persons, an event, a former use of the place, or some other thing. Many modern plaques and markers are used to associate the location where the plaque or marker is installed with the person, event, or item commemorated as a place worthy of visit. A monumental plaque or tablet commemorating a deceased person or persons, can be a simple form of church monument. Most modern plaques affixed in this way are commemorative of something, but this is not always the case, and there are purely religious plaques, or those signifying ownership or affiliation of some sort. A plaquette is a small plaque, but in English, unlike many European languages, the term is not typically used for outdoor plaques fixed to walls.

Historical

Benin Kingdom 
 
The Benin Empire, which flourished in present-day Nigeria between the thirteenth and nineteenth centuries, had an exceedingly rich sculptural tradition. One of the kingdom's chief sites of cultural production was the elaborate ceremonial court of the Oba (divine king) at the palace in Benin. Among the wide range of artistic forms produced at the court were rectangular brass or bronze plaques. At least a portion of these plaques, which were mainly created from the thirteenth through sixteenth centuries, commemorate significant persons and events associated with the Oba's court, including important battles during Benin's sixteenth century expansionary period.

Medieval Europe 

Brass or bronze memorial plaques were produced throughout medieval Europe from at least the early thirteenth through the sixteenth centuries as a form of sepulchral memorial generally inset into the walls of churches or surfaces of tombs. Surviving in great numbers, they were manufactured from sheet brass or latten, very occasionally coloured with enamels, and tend to depict highly conventional figures with brief inscriptions.

Modern 

Historical markers are put on display by the owners of sites listed by national agencies concerned with historic preservation such as the National Trust for Historic Preservation and the National Register of Historic Places (in the United States), the National Trust for Places of Historic Interest or Natural Beauty (in the United Kingdom), An Taisce (in Ireland), National Historical Commission of the Philippines (in the Philippines), and the National Trusts of other countries.

Other historical markers are created by local municipalities, non-profit organizations, companies, or individuals. In addition to geographically defined regions, individual organizations, such as E Clampus Vitus or the American Society of Mechanical Engineers, can choose to maintain a national set of historical markers that fit a certain theme.

The Royal Society of Arts established the first scheme in the world for historical commemoration on plaques in 1866.

The scheme was established under the influence of the British politician William Ewart and the civil servant Henry Cole. The first plaque was unveiled in 1867 to commemorate Lord Byron at his birthplace, 24 Holles Street, Cavendish Square. The earliest historical marker to survive, commemorates Napoleon III in King Street, St James's, and was also put up in 1867.

The original plaque colour was blue, but this was changed by the manufacturer Minton, Hollins & Co to chocolate brown to save money. In 1901, the scheme was first taken over by the local government authority - the London County Council.

Australia 
Halley Park plaque 
Heritage NSW - in April 2022 Heritage Minister, announced 17 Blue Plaques to celebrate NSW heritage by recognising noteworthy people and events from the state’s history. Inspired by the famous London Blue Plaques program run by English Heritage which originally started in 1866, and similar programs around the world, these plaques were selected from over 750 nominations received in November 2021 from community members, organisations and local councils. People and places recognised by the first batch of plaques to be erected include Bessie Robinson of Canowindra and Duke Kahanamoku and Camden Red Cross.

Austria 
Bundesdenkmalamt

Belgium 
Institut du Patrimoine wallon

Canada 
National Historic Sites of Canada
Index: National Historic Sites of Canada

Chile 
National Monuments of Chile

France 
Monument historique
 Plaque commémorative

Germany 

Deutsche Stiftung Denkmalschutz
Kulturdenkmal (National Heritage Sites)

Hong Kong 
Declared monuments of Hong Kong
List of Grade I historic buildings in Hong Kong
List of Grade II historic buildings in Hong Kong
List of Grade III historic buildings in Hong Kong

Italy 
Fondo per l'Ambiente Italiano (National Trust of Italy)

Netherlands 
Rijksmonument

New Zealand 
New Zealand Historic Places Trust

Philippines 

Historical markers (Filipino: panandang pangkasaysayan) are cast-iron plaques installed all over the Philippines that commemorate people, places, personalities, structures, and events. They are installed by the National Historical Commission of the Philippines. This practice started in 1933, with NHCP's predecessor, the Philippine Historical Research and Markers Committee, which initially only marked antiquities in Manila. The initial markers were placed in 1934.

Markers have their texts primarily in Filipino, while there are also markers in the English language, especially for markers that were installed during the American occupation. Markers in regional languages such as Cebuano, Ilocano, and Kapampangan, are also available and issued by the NHCP. Markers are found all over the country, and there have been markers installed outside the country. The plaques themselves are permanent signs installed in publicly visible locations on buildings, monuments, or in special locations. There are more than 1,500 markers to date.  Most markers are located within Luzon, especially in Metro Manila, which has prompted the NHCP to install more markers in Visayas and Mindanao, for their greater inclusion in the national historical narrative.

Issues and controversies have also been the concern of several individual markers, from the commemoration of former Philippine President Ferdinand Marcos to the reaction of the Japanese embassy to the comfort women statue and marker. There have also been some markers replaced by new ones because of rectified information, theft, or loss due to war or disasters. Many American-era markers have been destroyed or were lost as casualties of World War II.

Local municipalities and cities can also install markers of figures and events of local significance. Though they may have the permission of the NHCP, these markers are barred from using the seal of the Republic of the Philippines.

From March to October 2021, quincentennial historical markers were unveiled by the NHCP and the National Quincentennial Committee as part of the 2021 Quincentennial Commemorations in the Philippines (QCP).

Singapore 
National Monuments of Singapore

Switzerland 
Kulturgüterschutz — or: Protection des biens culturels; Cultural heritage protection in Switzerland; or Protezione dei beni culturali

United Kingdom 

Blue plaques are the principal type of historical markers found throughout England and are the closest thing there is to a historical marker system in the UK. An example is the blue plaque scheme run by English Heritage in London, although these were originally erected in a variety of shapes and colors. This has been running for over 140 years and is thought to be the oldest system of its kind in the world. Plaques are attached to buildings to commemorate their association with important occupants or events. The National Trust (which is a non-profit charity organization unlike English Heritage and English Heritage properties) has its own similar markers as well. The Dead Comics' Society installs blue plaques to commemorate the former residences of well-known comedians, including those of Sid James and John Le Mesurier. 

However, not all historical markers in the United Kingdom are blue, and many are not ceramic. A range of other commemorative plaque schemes, which are typically run by local councils and charitable bodies, exists throughout the United Kingdom. These tend to use their own criteria for determining the eligibility to put up a plaque. There are commemorative plaque schemes in Bath, Edinburgh, Brighton, Liverpool, Loughton, and elsewhere—some of which differ from the familiar blue plaque. A scheme in Manchester uses color-coded plaques to commemorate figures, with each of the colors corresponding to the person's occupation. The Purple Plaques/Placiau Porffor scheme in Wales uses purple to commemorate significant women. In 2003, the London Borough of Southwark started a plaque scheme which included living people in the awards. Even in London, the Westminster City Council runs a green plaque scheme which is run alongside that of the blue plaque scheme administered by English Heritage. Other schemes are run by civic societies, district or town councils, or local history groups, and often operate with different criteria.

 
After the First World War, the families of British and British Empire (now Commonwealth) service men and women killed during the conflict were presented with bronze Memorial Plaques.

United States 
In the United States, various state governments have commemorative plaque schemes usually using the name historical markers. The National Trust for Historic Preservation or the U.S. Government, through the National Register of Historic Places, can bestow historical status.

State programmes, such as the California Register of Historical Resources, allow designated sites to place their own markers.

The criteria and circumstances through which a party administers the distribution of historical markers varies. For example, the "Preservation Worcester" program in Worcester, Massachusetts, allows a person to register their house or other structure of least fifty years of age if the building is well preserved, with retention of its original character and importance to the architectural, cultural or historical nature of the local neighborhood. One then pays a fee ($185 to $225) to receive the historical marker itself.

In the same state, the Boston neighborhood of Charlestown, Massachusetts has its own local association to administer historical markers.  Other historical markers in and around Boston are administered by agencies such as The Bostonian Society or are associated with sites such as those along the Freedom Trail, the Black Heritage Trail, and the Emerald Necklace.

Other examples of mostly locally generated historical markers in the United States include the plaque outside the Alaska Governor's Mansion made by the Alaska Centennial Commission's historical markers program, the historical markers of State Historic Marker Council in Florida, the markers placed by various agencies in Georgia (of which one source mentions 3,292 different historical markers), in Indiana, where it is illegal to create a historical marker in the "state format" without first getting official approval from that state's historical bureau, historical markers in Kansas erected by the Kansas Historical Society and the Kansas Department of Transportation, the Roadside Historic Marker Program in Maryland administered by the Maryland Historical Trust, the State Historic Marker Program of New York (begun in 1926 to commemorate the Sequicentennial of the American Revolution), the historic markers placed as recently as 2008 in Sussex County, New Jersey, the New Mexico historical markers printed in white letters on a brown background by the New Mexico Department of Transportation, the historical markers of North Carolina (the Historical Publications Section of the state Office of Archives and History publishes a Guide to North Carolina Highway Historical Markers), the more than 1200 historical markers of Ohio (all of which are now made in a Marietta, Ohio, workshop), and over 550 official state markers in Wisconsin.

See also:

Historical markers posted at U.S. state and/or municipal levels (examples):
Indiana State Historic Markers — of statewide historical significance, by state
New Hampshire State Historic Markers — of statewide historical significance, by state
New York State Historic Markers — of statewide historical significance, by state
Nevada Historic Markers — of statewide historical significance, by state
Pennsylvania State Historic Markers — of statewide historical significance, by state
Georgia Historic Markers
Texas Historic Markers
North Carolina Highway Historical Marker Program, part of the North Carolina Department of Cultural Resources

Theft 
As the price of scrap metal has increased plaques have been the target of metal thieves wishing to resell the metal for cash.

Awards 
Plaques or, more often, plaquettes, are also given as awards instead of trophies or ribbons. Such plaques usually bear text describing the reason for the award and, often, the date of the award.

See also 
 Blue plaque
 Hartog Plate
 Historical markers of the Philippines
 Parting stone
 Stolperstein
List of blue plaques
Statutory List of Buildings of Special Architectural or Historic Interest
National Trust for Places of Historic Interest or Natural Beauty – England, Wales, and Northern Ireland.
National Trust for Scotland – Scotland

Notes

References
 James Loewen, Lies Across America: What Our Historic Sites Get Wrong, 1999.
 English Heritage, Blue Plaques: A Guide to the Scheme, 2002
 Nick Rennison, The London Blue Plaque Guide, 2003
 Derek Sumeray, Discovering London Plaques
 Derek Sumeray, Track the Plaque, 2003

External links

Award items
Cultural heritage
Cultural history
Cultural history of the United States
Monuments and memorials
 01
Signage
Types of monuments and memorials